, real name Shūji Satō (佐藤修司 Satō Shūji, born December 19, 1957, in Kutchan, Abuta District, Hokkaidō), is a Japanese manga artist.

Yuki graduated from Kutchan High School. He is a member of the artist group known as Headgear. In 1991, his manga Mobile Police Patlabor received the 36th Shogakukan Manga Award for shōnen.

Works
Aliens Next Door (1 tankōbon)
Assemble Insert
Atom: The Beginning
Birdy the Mighty
Original version: 1 tankōbon
Remake: 20 tankōbon as of October 2008
Birdy the Mighty: Evolution
 13 tankōbon as of October 2012
Doyō Wide Satsujin Jiken (1 tankōbon, co-authored with Miki Tori)
Doyō Wide Satsujin Jiken: Kyōto Waraningyō Satsujin Jiken (1 tankōbon)
Jaja Uma Grooming Up! (26 tankōbon, 14 bunkoban)
Kyūkyoku Chōjin R (5 bunkobon)
Magical Lucy
Mariana Densetsu (3 tankōbon)
Pangea no Musume Kunie (5 tankōbon)
Parody World
Mobile Police Patlabor (22 tankōbon, 11 wideban, 11 bunkoban)
Shinkurō, Hashiru! (11 tankōbon as of September 2022)
Yamato Takeru no Bōken
Yūki Masami no Hateshinai Monogatari (2 tankōbon)

Yuki is also the designer of the avatar mascot for the Vocaloid Gumi.

References

External links
Yūki Masami Official Site (in Japanese)

 
1957 births
Living people
Manga artists from Hokkaido